Ice cellar may refer to:

Ice cellar, a food storage technology used by Alaska Natives
Ice cellar, a room for storing ice harvested through ice cutting